Paloma may refer to:

Arts and media
 "Paloma", a song by Mika from My Name Is Michael Holbrook (2019)
 Paloma (film), a 2022 film by Brazilian director Marcelo Gomes
 Paloma (novel), by Kristine Kathryn Rusch
 Paloma (TV series), a 1975 Mexican TV series, or telenovela

People 
 Paloma (name)

Places in the United States 
 Paloma, California, an unincorporated community in Calaveras County, California
 Paloma, Illinois, an unincorporated community
 Paloma Elementary School District, Maricopa County, Arizona

Other uses 
 Hurricane Paloma, a hurricane in the 2008 Atlantic hurricane season
 Paloma (cocktail), a popular tequila-based cocktail
 , a Japanese gas appliance manufacturer, owner of the Australian Rheem Manufacturing Company
 USC Paloma, a football team based in Hamburg, Germany
 , a yacht converted into an armed patrol boat for World War I

See also 
 "Cucurrucucú paloma", a song by Tomás Méndez
 La Paloma (disambiguation)
 Palomas (disambiguation)
 Paluma (disambiguation)
 Pamola, a legendary bird spirit in Abenaki mythology